Jeevan TV is an Indian Malayalam language news and entertainment free to air television channel. Its headquarters is at Palarivattom, Kochi, India.
Jeevan TV first aired its news and entertainment programs on 14 July 2002.

Programs

News Based 
 Azhchavattom
 Gulf News Week
 Kazchappathippu
 Manthriyodoppam
 Nalathe Vartha
 Netizen Journalist
 Positive News
 Prime Minister Speaking
 WMC News

Entertainment 
 Al- Balaagh
 Amarasangeetham
 Chiricheppu
 Cinema Talkies (Sunday Movie)
 Cinema Week
 Comedy Couples
 Ente Ishttaganangal
 Film Online
 Hit Songs
 Jeevan Celebrations
 Malayala Cinema @ 90
 Memories
 Old is Gold
 Omaneeyam
 Prabhatha Geethangal
 Ragalayam
 Shubharathri
 Star Chat

External links
 Malayalam channel Jeevan TV targets 14 July launch

Malayalam-language television channels
Television stations in Kochi
2002 establishments in Kerala